Glenurus is a genus of antlions in the family Myrmeleontidae. There are about 12 described species in Glenurus.

Species
These 12 species belong to the genus Glenurus:

References

Further reading

External links
 

Myrmeleontinae
Myrmeleontidae genera